Iberus Vallis is a valley in the Elysium quadrangle of Mars, located at 21.5° N and 208.0° W.  It is 80.2 km long and was named after a classical name for the Ebro River in NE Spain.

References 

Valleys and canyons on Mars
Elysium quadrangle